Speed bumps (also called traffic thresholds, speed breakers or sleeping policemen) are a class of traffic calming devices that use vertical deflection to slow motor-vehicle traffic in order to improve safety conditions. Variations include the speed hump, speed cushion, and speed table.

The use of vertical deflection devices is widespread around the world, and they are most commonly used to enforce a low speed limit, under  or lower.

Although speed bumps are effective in keeping vehicle speeds down, their use is sometimes controversial—as they can increase traffic noise, may damage vehicles if traversed at too great a speed, and slow emergency vehicles. Poorly-designed speed bumps that stand too tall or with too-sharp an angle can be disruptive for drivers, and may be difficult to navigate for vehicles with low ground clearance, even at very low speeds. Many sports cars have this problem with such speed bumps. Speed bumps can also pose serious hazards to motorcyclists and bicyclists if they are not clearly visible, though in some cases a small cut across the bump allows those vehicles to traverse without impediment.

Composition
Each of these devices can be made from a variety of materials, including asphalt, concrete, recycled plastic, metal, or vulcanized rubber. Several trade-offs must be made when selecting the material for a new speed cushion. Traditionally most vertical deflection devices have been constructed of asphalt or concrete. Due to the rigidity and durability of these materials, they have more permanence and are more effective at slowing traffic. However, they can be difficult to shape and form into consistent forms and precise dimensions.

Rubber products are pre-shaped to standard sizes to meet industry standards. Preformed rubber products are typically bolted down, making them easier to install or remove. Temporary bolt-down installations can be ideal for planners in testing the use and positioning of speed bumps before implementing them in a larger project. Bolt-down products can also be removed or relocated during winter snow periods—where speed bumps are easily concealed and may be damaged by snowplows.

History
On June 7, 1906, The New York Times reported on an early implementation of what might be considered speed bumps in Chatham, New Jersey, which planned to raise its crosswalks five inches above the road level: "This scheme of stopping automobile speeding has been discussed by different municipalities, but Chatham is the first place to put it in practice".

Arthur Holly Compton was a physicist and winner of the Nobel Prize in physics in 1927 for his discoveries resulting in major changes in electromagnetic theory. He is commonly known for his work on the Compton Effect with X-rays. He also invented what he called "traffic control bumps," the basic design for the speed hump, in 1953. Compton began designs on the speed bump after noticing the speed at which motorists passed Brookings Hall at Washington University in St. Louis, Missouri, where he was chancellor.

The British Transport and Road Research Laboratory published a comprehensive report in 1973 examining vehicle behavior for a large variety of different bump geometries. At the time speed humps were not permitted on public roads but had been installed on private roads.

According to a publication by the Institute of Transportation Engineers, the first speed bump in Europe was built in 1970 in the city of Delft in the Netherlands.

Speed bumps

A speed bump is also known as a sleeping policeman in British English, Maltese English and Caribbean English, a judder bar in New Zealand English, and a lying-down policeman in Colombia, Dominican Republic, Croatia, Serbia, Estonia, Lithuania, Slovenia, Bulgaria and Russia.

Speed bumps vary in length, but it is typical to leave space between the bump and either edge of an enclosed road (i.e. with curbs and gutters) to allow for drainage. Spaces on either side may also allow more expedient passage for emergency vehicles, though effectiveness will depend on the type of vehicle and specific road design.

Disadvantages
Local authorities have cited disadvantages to speed bumps:
The city of Modesto in California, produced a fact sheet which contains the following disadvantages:
 Slow response time of emergency vehicles;
 May divert traffic to parallel residential streets; and
 Possible increase in noise and pollution for residents living immediately adjacent to the speed bumps.
 The English town of Eastleigh states the following as disadvantages:
 Can cause damage to some vehicles;
 Can increase traffic noise, especially when large goods vehicles pass by;
 Required signs, street lighting and white lines may be visually intrusive;
 Can cause discomfort for drivers and passengers;
 Can cause problems for emergency services and buses.

Other sources argue that speed bumps:
 Distract drivers from other hazards such as children
 Increase pollution as traffic travels in a lower gear using significantly more fuel per mile;
 Are a compromise for more active enforcement;
 Increase noise by creating tire-to-bump thumping and increasing the amount of engine-revving;
 Cause spinal damage and aggravate chronic backache.

In 2003, the chairman of the London Ambulance Service, Sigurd Reinton claimed that delays caused by speed bumps were responsible for up to 500 avoidable deaths from cardiac arrest each year. He later denied the statement.

In Sweden, an evaluation of spinal stress in bus drivers against ISO 2631-5 required on health grounds that:
 bus drivers avoid certain streets until the humps were modified; and

Speed bumps can also have adverse environmental impact. It also produced 47 per cent more particulate matter (PM) and nearly 60 per cent more carbon monoxide (CO) emissions. Another study estimated that, for a private automobile, the increase in fuel consumption due a pass over a speed bump is responsible for fuel waste of 10ml. This multiplied with the number of vehicles going over a particular speed bump every day suggests significant annual fuel wastage for a single speed bump.

Dynamic speed bumps
Dynamic speed bumps differ from conventional speed bumps in that they only activate if a vehicle is traveling above a certain speed. Vehicles traveling below this speed will not experience the discomfort of a conventional speed bump. Dynamic speed bumps may allow the passage of emergency vehicles at higher speeds.

The Actibump system, successfully used in Sweden, is based on powered equipment integrated into the road surface, which operates a platform that is lowered a few centimeters when a speeding vehicle approaches. Any vehicle approaching at or under the speed limit will pass on a level road. The system measures the speed of an oncoming vehicle by using radar.

In another design, a rubber housing is fitted with a pressure relief valve that determines the speed of a vehicle. If the vehicle is traveling below the set speed, the valve opens allowing the bump to deflate as the vehicle drives over it, but it remains closed if the vehicle is traveling too fast. The valve can also be set to allow heavy vehicles, such as fire trucks, ambulances, and buses to cross at higher speeds.

Speed humps

A speed hump (also called a road hump, or undulation, and speed ramp) is a rounded traffic calming device used to reduce vehicle speed and thus sound volume on residential streets. Humps are placed across the road to slow traffic and are often installed in a series of several humps to prevent cars from speeding before and after the hump. Common speed hump shapes are parabolic, circular, and sinusoidal. In Norway, speed humps are often placed at pedestrian crossings.

The traverse distance and height of each hump determines the speed at which traffic will travel over the devices. Shorter traverse lengths and greater heights slow cars most drastically.

Warning signs should be used to notify approaching motorists of upcoming humps. Humps generally have pavement markings to enhance visibility and a taper edge near the curb to allow a gap for drainage.

Speed humps are used in locations where low speeds are desired and suitable for the surrounding traffic environment. Speed humps are typically placed on residential roads and are not used on major roads, bus routes, or primary emergency response routes. Placement is generally mid-block between intersections.

Results
Studies show an average 18% reduction in traffic volume and an average 13% reduction in collisions.

Comparison to speed bumps 
While similar to speed bumps, humps are less aggressive than speed bumps at low speeds. Humps are often used on streets, while bumps are used more in parking lots. The narrow traverse distance of speed bumps often allows vehicles to pass over them at high speed with only mild disturbance to the wheels and suspension, and hardly affecting the vehicle cab and its occupants. The relatively long slopes of speed humps are less disruptive at low–moderate speeds, but they create a greater, more sustained vertical deflection; at higher speeds, a more sustained deflection is less-absorbed by vehicle suspensions and has a greater effect on the vehicle as a whole.

Problems
One problematic aspect of speed humps is their effect on emergency vehicles. Response time is slowed by 3–5 seconds per hump for fire trucks and fire engines and up to 10 seconds for ambulances with patients on board. Speed humps are thus usually not placed on primary response routes. Speed cushions may be placed on these routes instead.

Occasionally, there is an increase in traffic noise from braking and acceleration of vehicles on streets with speed humps, particularly from buses and trucks. Other effects include increased fuel consumption and emissions as well as increased wear and tear on brakes, engine and suspension components.

Damage caused by snow plows during the winter months is an additional concern.

Heavy sedans, trucks, and SUVs are less affected by speed humps, and may not have to slow down as dramatically.

Thin cuts are sometimes placed in the middle of a hump in order to allow bicycle traffic to pass through. However, forcing cyclists to take a particular line on the road compromises their ability to position themselves safely according to the other traffic on the road at the time.

Speed cushions

Speed cushions are a type of speed hump installation designed to alleviate the negative impacts that vertical deflections have on emergency vehicle response times. Speed cushions installations are typically made up of several small speed humps installed across the width of the road with spaces between them. They force normal cars to slow down as they ride with one or both wheels over the humps. Meanwhile, they allow fire engines (and other large vehicles) with wider axles to straddle the cushions without slowing down.

Wider, American-style ambulances might also be able to straddle speed cushions. However, in Europe and Australia, where vehicles like the Mercedes-Benz Sprinter are used most frequently as ambulances, there is no advantage. In these jurisdictions, narrower speed cushions are sometimes placed between lanes to allow ambulances to pass unobstructed while driving over the centre line during an emergency.

Advantages
Speed cushions have several distinct advantages over similar traffic calming devices. Many municipalities are challenged by opposition to speed humps and speed tables since they slow down emergency vehicles. Speed cushions address this problem by allowing larger vehicles to straddle the cushion without slowing down. This is also an advantage for buses, as lower floor vehicles can sometimes ground out on traditional humps.

Speed cushions are often less costly than speed humps or tables, and most cities report them to be just as effective. In some jurisdictions, narrower speed cushions are placed at more frequent intervals to allow ambulances to pass while driving over the centre line. Large trucks are also not slowed down.

Use in North America and Europe 
Development of speed cushions has focused primarily on the European context. European vehicles typically have a narrower track width than American vehicles, meaning their left and right wheels are closer together. Emergency vehicles still feature a wide track width, and the difference between them makes speed cushions more applicable.

Many emergency vehicles are also equipped with dual tires on their rear axles.

Speed tables 

A speed table (or flat top hump or raised pedestrian crossing)  is designed as a long speed hump with a flat section in the middle. Speed tables are generally long enough for the entire wheelbase of a passenger car to rest on top. The long, flat design allows cars to pass without slowing as significantly as with speed humps or cushions. Because they slow cars less than similar devices, speed tables are often used on roads with typical residential speed limits.

Speed tables can also be signed as pedestrian crossings, namely zebra crossings. A raised zebra crossing is referred to as a  wombat  crossing in Australia. Other road features may be included, such as junctions, or even mini-roundabouts. Speed tables are used with zebra crossings repeatedly in Leighton Buzzard.

Results
One sample of 8 sites found a 45% decrease in accidents per year with the use of speed tables. Wombat crossings may reduce casualties by 63%.

Advantages
Speed tables are effective in calming traffic on streets where the speed limit needs to be maintained rather than slowing cars more significantly. Traffic speed, volumes, and accidents have been shown to decrease with the use of tables. Although not as responsive to emergency vehicles as speed cushions, speed tables cause less of a delay than humps and are typically preferred by fire departments over speed humps.

In the United Kingdom
In the UK, vertical deflection in highways for the purpose of traffic calming typically takes one of the following forms:
 Road humps are the most common variety, and are usually round-topped.
 Speed tables, a type of hump with a central plateau which is both long and broad, and which may include a pedestrian crossing, junction or roundabout, are preferred by some emergency services and bus operators.
 Speed cushions, a raised portion of road with a flat top only extending over part of the carriageway's width, are used singly, in a pinch point, or in pairs or triples.
 Rumble strips, uneven road surfaces, are now only used in rural areas and retail parks because of the noise.

The Department for Transport defines the regulations for the design and use of road humps.

Opposition
Speed bumps in some areas have been removed after protests by local residents. Such protests cite the lack of any consultation as one factor. For example, complaints from Derby residents prompted the removal of 146 speed bumps from streets at a cost of £460,000. Similar incidents have been reported elsewhere in the UK. UK news sources reported a cyclist being killed in a crash while attempting to avoid a speed bump.

See also
 Breakover angle
 Glossary of road transport terms
 Road surface marking
 Rumble strip

References

External links

Speed Bumps
Questions and Answers about Speed Humps
City of Austin Speed Cushion Description
UK Department for Transport Speed Cushion Description
 London Assembly, London's got the hump, April 2004. An examination of speed humps conducted by the London Assembly’s Transport Committee.
Institute of Transportation Engineers Speed Table Description
Speed Humps Protect Children from Injury
Speed Hump Description

Traffic calming
Road infrastructure
Road safety
Road transport
Transportation planning
Road hazards